Despina Vandi (Greek: Δέσποινα Βανδή) is the first box set album by Greek singer Despina Vandi, featuring her three previous compilations Dance, Ballads, and Ta Laïka Tis Despinas, released in 2005 by her previous record label Minos EMI in Greece and Cyprus.

Track listing

Release history

Credits and personnel

Personnel
T. Apostolidis - music
Panos Falaras - lyrics
Natalia Germanou - lyrics
Pantelis Kanarakis - lyrics
Thanasis Kargidis - music
Vasilis Karras - music, lyrics
L. Komninos - lyrics
Tony Kontaxakis - music, lyrics
Lambis Livieratos - lyrics
Christoforos Mpalampanidis - lyrics
Christos Nikolopoulos - music
Giannis Parios - lyrics
Giorgos Pavrianos - lyrics
Phoebus - music, lyrics
Despina Vandi - vocals

Production
Panos Bothos - transfer

Design
Evi Efthimiou - artwork
Giorgos Kolovos - artwork
Takis Spiropoulos - photos

Credits adapted from the album's liner notes.

References

External links
 Official site 

2005 compilation albums
Albums produced by Phoebus (songwriter)
Despina Vandi compilation albums
Greek-language albums
Minos EMI compilation albums